Caiseal Mór (Cash-el More) is an Australian sci-fi and fantasy novelist, artist and musician. His name is an Irish Gaelic idiom for "great stone fort”. Ancient Celtic Folklore has been a major inspiration for his thirteen published Fantasy novels. Mór also composes and records music, having produced seventeen albums since 1995. He is well known for his self-designed book and album covers and his intricate artworks in both traditional and digital mediums. Since 2013 he has been developing a distinctive graphic art style and creating digital sculptures in 3D.

Life and career
As a child, Mór was diagnosed on the autism spectrum as a savant. This was discussed in his autobiography A Blessing and a Curse; Autism and Me (2007). In his autobiography he writes about the profound difficulties he had as a child with conformity and the judgement of others.

In his early twenties Mór left Australia to travel through India, Europe and North Africa. On this journey he met musicians and yogis from the Hindu and Sufi traditions. At this time he developed an obsession for non-Western music and instruments. In Turkey he was introduced to the Yayli Tanbur - an instrument that continues to feature in his musical compositions.

After returning to Australia in 1986 Mór was encouraged by friends to audition for the Performing Arts degree programme at the University of Western Sydney ( Theatre Nepean ) in 1987. He graduated in 1990 and moved straight into teaching drama and art in the Catholic education system. In late 1993 he resigned his teaching position and within months had signed a contract for his first novel: “The Circle and The Cross”.
A few distinct themes recur throughout Mór's novels. He focuses on an examination of religion versus spirituality, gods, deities and spirits, magic and technology. He also questions the basis of authority and the focus of western culture on conformity. Most of his stories are set in early medieval Ireland and Scotland. They feature a personal interpretation of the Celtic Otherworld. The concept of the Celtic Otherworld is expanded upon in his soon to be published Science Fiction works in which the setting is a series of alternative dimensions.

Mór is currently working on a series of graphic novels with all original artwork and design created by him under the title “Veil of the Gods”. In the last few years he has released a few artworks hinting that this major digital work will incorporate a musical score, animation and may be developed into a motion picture or television series.

Mór began creating musical art objects at university and later moved on to building shamanic style and tribal drums. After a journey to Mongolia in 2015 Mór began building shamanic style drums based on traditional Mongolian designs.
Since 1999 Mór has toured Australia and the world offering unique musical experiences based on his exposure to Eastern traditions. Since 2012 he has collaborated with the singer and multi-instrumentalist, Laya Rocha, on a series of all night concerts known as the Dreaming Deep. These events are based on Hindu and Sufi trance practices. All the music is improvised. The audience is encouraged to drift into sleep as the concert progresses toward dawn.

Book titles

Science Fiction/Fantasy

 Veil Of The Gods Graphic Novel series (2018)

Fantasy fiction

The Wanderers
 The Circle and the Cross (1995)
 The Song of the Earth (1996)
 The Water of Life (1997)

The Watchers trilogy
 The Meeting of the Waters (2002) (Illustrated by Anne Yvonne Gilbert US edition only)
 The King of Sleep (2002) (Illustrated by Anne Yvonne Gilbert US edition only)
 The Raven Game (2003) (Illustrated by Anne Yvonne GilbertUS edition only)

Other fantasy fiction
 The Tilecutters Penny (1998)
 The Harp at Midnight (1999)
 Carolan's Concerto (2001)
 Lady of the Lamp (2008)

Wellspring Trilogy
 Well of Yearning (2004)
 Well of the Goddess (2005)
 Well of Many-Blessings (2005)

Non-fiction
 Scratches in the Margin (1996)
 The Moon on the Lake (1995)
 What is Magic? (2009)
 What is Magic? the Ebook (2011)

Autobiography
 A Blessing and a Curse; Autism and Me (2007) published by Jessica Kingsley Publishers, published May 2007

Music and spoken word albums
 Circle and the Cross ( Companion to the novel of the same name ) (1995 )
 Song of the Earth ( Companion to the novel of the same name ) (1996)
 Water of life ( Companion to the novel of the same name ) (1997)
 The Moon on the Lake (1998 )
 Loom of Music ( 1999 )
 [The Well of Yearning] (companion to Well-Spring Trilogy - books ) (2002 )
 Beautiful Hands (Celtic Harp) (2003 )
 Divine Passion - Rain Water  (2004 )
 Divine Passion - Air  (2005 )
 What is Magic?(2009)
 Flow  (2010)
 Alchemy for the Heart (Creative Trance) (2011)
 Dreaming Tree - Red (Creative Trance) (2012) 
 Dreaming Tree - The Green Album (Dreaming Music and Creative Trance) (2013)
 Prana  ( 2014 )
 Dreaming Deep ( 2015 )
 Ninety-Nine Skies ( 2016 )

1961 births
Australian fantasy writers
Australian people of Irish descent
Living people
People on the autism spectrum
Australian male novelists